Morpho cypris, the Cypris morpho, is a Neotropical butterfly. It is found in Panama, Costa Rica, Nicaragua, Colombia, Venezuela, Trinidad and Tobago and Ecuador. Several subspecies and many forms have been described.

Description
Morpho cypris replaces M. rhetenor in Colombia and Central America and one might strictly speaking unite it with the latter as a geographical branch unless the anatomy shows essential differences, M. cypris is here, however, kept separate on account of the rounded shape of the forewing and the somewhat more vertically placed white median band of the upper surface, M. cypris and M. helena outshine even the other Morphids in their incomparable gloss and M. cypris in particular is a true gem, unequalled in its brilliance throughout the whole of nature (Schatz). According to the fall of the light the blue of this incomparable insect shows a more violet or more greenish gloss and the delicate white band a yellowish tone or more of a tinge of rose colour. The blue is of such ethereal purity and such intensive lustre that all the other colours appear faded or dull in comparison. Only the Malayo-Australian Ornithoptera can outrival the Morphids, adding as they do to the brilliance of their golden green colouring the further charm of a quite distinguished form and wing contour. The scaling itself, as in M. rhetenor, remains fixed, but the interference scales are wanting in the normal females so that these are of the primitive yellowish ochreous (brassolid) ground colour common to all the species of the M. adonis group.

Etymology
Cypris is another name for Aphrodite, a beautiful Greek goddess.

References

 Le Moult (E.) & Réal (P.), 1962-1963. Les Morpho d'Amérique du Sud et Centrale, Editions du cabinet entomologique E. Le Moult, Paris.
Paul Smart, 1976 The Illustrated Encyclopedia of the Butterfly World in Color. London, Salamander: Encyclopedie des papillons. Lausanne, Elsevier Sequoia (French language edition)   page 232 fig.2 (Colombia).

Further reading
DeVries, P.J. & G.E. Martinez (1993) The morphology, natural history, and behavior of the early stages of Morpho cypris (Nymphalidae: Morphinae) – 140 years after formal recognition of the butterfly, Journal of the New York Entomological Society, 101: 515-530.

External links
"Morpho Fabricius, 1807" at Markku Savela's Lepidoptera and Some Other Life Forms
Butterflies of America Images of type and other specimens.
Fiebig Photographs, including microphotography of the scales.

cypris
Nymphalidae of South America